Tricyclobutabenzene is an aromatic hydrocarbon consisting of a benzene core with three cyclobutane rings fused onto it. This compound and related compounds are studied in the laboratory because they are often displaying unusual conformations and because of their unusual reactivity. Tricyclobutabenzenes are isomers of radialenes and form an equilibrium with them.

A polyoxygenated tricyclobutabenzene with an extraordinary bond length of 160 pm for the bond connecting two carbonyl groups by the following sequence:

An ordinary bond of this type is only 148 pm and for comparison the C-C bond in isatin is 154 pm long. On the other hand, no change is recorded in the aromatic bond length alternation.

Similar chemistry yielded the six-fold ketone hexaoxotricyclobutabenzene C12O6, which happens to be a novel oxide of carbon. A key starting material is the iodo triflate depicted below which is a benzotriyne synthon.

See also
 Biphenyl
 Triphenyl
 Terpyridine
 Terthiophene
 Naphthalene where the rings are fused

References

Polycyclic aromatic hydrocarbons
Tetracyclic compounds
Cyclobutanes
Cyclobutenes